Tuber Hill is a small 600,000-year-old basaltic stratovolcano that was constructed on the Bridge River highlands when nearby valleys were packed with ice. Tuber Hill is part of the Garibaldi segment of the Canadian Cascade Arc, but is not in the geographic Cascade Range.

See also
 Bridge River Cones
 Garibaldi Volcanic Belt
 Bridge River
 List of volcanoes in Canada
 Volcanism of Canada
 Volcanism of Western Canada
 Cascade Volcanic Arc

References
 
 Catalogue of Canadian volcanoes - Tuber Hill

Volcanoes of British Columbia
Two-thousanders of British Columbia
Stratovolcanoes of Canada
Garibaldi Volcanic Belt
Pleistocene volcanoes
Pacific Ranges